Chait is a Hebrew surname.

Chait may also refer to:
Chait (Nepali calendar), a Nepali month
Chaitra, Hindu calendar month